Pseudodifflugia is a genus of Cercozoans.

It was described in 1845.

References

Cercozoa genera
Gromiidea